Unione Sportiva Palestrina 1919 is an Italian association football club, based in Palestrina but playing in the San Basilio district of Rome, Lazio. The club currently plays in Serie D.

History

San Basilio Palestrina 
The club was founded in 2012 after obtaining the sports title of Serie D club U.S. Palestrina 1919, based in Palestrina. The owners of the company are Augusto Cristofari, its former president, together with other Roman entrepreneurs.

U.S. Palestrina 1919 
In summer 2013 the club changed its name back to U.S. Palestrina 1919.

Colours and badge 
The team's colors are orange, green and white

Stadium 
It plays at the Centro Sportivo Francesca Gianni, Rome.

References

External links 
 Official site

 
Football clubs in Lazio
Association football clubs established in 1919
1919 establishments in Italy
Sport in the Metropolitan City of Rome Capital